What's Goin' On is an album by jazz musician Frank Strozier, recorded in 1977 for SteepleChase Records. It would be his last effort as a leader.

Track listing 
All tracks by Strozier, except where noted.

"What's Going On" - 13:41 (Gaye, Benson, Cleveland)
"The Chief" - 4:14 (Mabern)
"Chelsea Drugs" - 5:19
"Ollie" - 4:28
"Psalm for John Coltrane" - 6:36

Personnel 
 Frank Strozier - alto sax, flute (3)
 Danny Moore - trumpet (2-3)
 Harold Mabern - piano
 Stafford James - bass
 Louis Hayes - drums

References 

1978 albums
SteepleChase Records albums
Frank Strozier albums